Kürşad Sürmeli (born 14 August 1995) is a Dutch footballer who plays as a midfielder for Turkish club Altınordu.

A youth product of NEC, Sürmeli experienced his breakthrough as part of the Achilles '29 team competing in the second-tier Eerste Divisie. He later played for clubs in Turkey and Belgium.

Club career

Early years
Starting his career as a youth player at SV Hatert and Quick 1888, Sürmeli moved the youth academy of NEC in 2008. After failing to make the cut, he moved to NEC's amateur branch, Sportclub NEC. A few months later, he signed a contract, which made him a regular part of NEC Amateurs.

Achilles '29
On 18 June 2013, Sürmeli joined Eerste Divisie club Achilles '29 in June 2013, and made his professional debut on 24 August 2013 in a game against Almere City FC in the absence of team captain Twan Smits who was serving a suspension. More than a month later, he appeared in an away game against FC Den Bosch (0–2 win) in the final minutes coming on for Levi Raja Boean. A week later he came in as a substitute for Kay Thomassen and scored the equaliser against Jong PSV with a strike from distance. The match was eventually won 3–2. Two weeks later, against Willem II, he replaced Smits again, this time because he suffered hamstring injury. Sürmeli also started as a defensive midfielder against Fortuna Sittard and in a KNVB Cup match against AZ. In the winter break, head coach François Gesthuizen decided to a system which facilitated two defensive midfielders instead of one, opening up a spot for Sürmeli in the starting eleven. The first league match of 2014 featured Sürmeli and Jop van Steen as central defensive midfielders was won 2–1 against Almere City. Due to an injury, he missed the upcoming away match against FC Dordrecht (4–2) and was only used as a substitute at home against FC Emmen (0–0). After a month without appearances, he made six appearances in a row, where he was used as a substitute in five of them. Sürmeli played the last four games of the season as a starter.

In the first ten matches of the following season, Sürmeli was a starter eight times and a used substitute once. On 28 September 2014, he scored two goals in the 0–4 away win at RKC Waalwijk and played the full 90 minutes: he scored the 0–1 and the 0–3 goals. Against MVV, he lost his starting spot due to an injury and he was benched for the next eight matches, although he came in as a substitute in seven of them. One of these matches, on 12 December, in the home game against VVV-Venlo (3–0), he scored the last goal as a substitute. After the winter break, he began as a starter on right midfield. On 2 March 2015, Sürmeli scored his fifth goal for Achilles, and his fourth of the season, in a match against Telstar with a long distance strike. Two and a half weeks later, he headed in the 2–1 lead against Almere City from a cross by Twan Smits, in a match that ended 3–1. In the 2016–17 season, he suffered relegation from the Eerste Divisie with Achilles '29, after which he left as a free agent. After turning down offers from Italian Serie B club Carpi, and Turkish clubs Adanaspor and Adana Demirspor, he decided to stay with Achilles '29 in August.

Adanaspor and Lienden
In early January 2018, Sürmeli triggered a release clause to leave Achilles '29 in the winter break, after the club had filed for bankruptcy, and join Turkish TFF First League club Adanaspor. After making no appearances for the side he had his contract terminated at the end of the month, and he joined Dutch Tweede Divisie club FC Lienden on 31 January.

Giresunspor and Winkel
From the 2018–19 season, Sürmeli had an agreement to join De Treffers. At the end of July 2018, he left De Treffers before the start of the competition and signed a two-year contract with Giresunspor of the TFF First League. At the beginning of January 2019, he had his contract terminated as he had not received his salary. Afterwards, he had a deal with Osmanlıspor, but due to an injury the club refused to formalise the agreement and Sürmeli was leaved as a free agent.

On 12 July 2019, Sürmeli joined Sint-Eloois-Winkel, a team competing in the third-tier Belgian First Amateur Division.

Dordrecht and MVV
On 20 August 2020, Sürmeli returned to the Netherlands where he signed a one-year contract with FC Dordrecht. On 1 January 2021, he signed a one-and-a-half-year contract with an option for an addition year with league rivals MVV Maastricht. Upon his arrival, MVV manager Darije Kalezić praised him as a player with a "dominant presence", who could help the club reach a higher level.

Return to Turkey
On 14 August 2021, he signed a two-year contract with Altınordu.

References

External links
 
 

1995 births
Dutch people of Turkish descent
Footballers from Nijmegen
Living people
Dutch footballers
Dutch expatriate footballers
Achilles '29 players
Adanaspor footballers
FC Lienden players
Sint-Eloois-Winkel Sport players
Quick 1888 players
Giresunspor footballers
FC Dordrecht players
MVV Maastricht players
Altınordu F.K. players
Eerste Divisie players
Tweede Divisie players
TFF First League players
Belgian Third Division players
Association football midfielders
Dutch expatriate sportspeople in Belgium
Expatriate footballers in Belgium
Dutch expatriate sportspeople in Turkey
Expatriate footballers in Turkey